Associazione Sportiva Dilettanti Atletico Trivento was an Italian association football club located in Trivento, Molise.

History 
The club was founded in 1964.

Eccellenza 
Atletico Trvento played for some years the championship of Eccellenza Molise arriving in middle positions at the end of the season. In 2006–2007 Trivento and Olympia Agnonese were the second and the first at the last match. They played the match which finished 1–1 so Olympia Agnonese was promoted in Serie D. In the next season Trivento led the championship and finally won the championship. During the season 2007–2008 Trivento won also Coppa Italia Eccellenza Molise and reached semi-finals in the Coppa Italia Eccellenza, after winning with Atessa and with Formia in quarter-finals, being defeated by Hinterreggio, who eventually won the Coppa Italia Eccellenza.

Serie D 

In summer 2012 it does not appeal against the exclusion of Covisod from Serie D and so was excluded from all football.

Colors and badge 
The official color of the society were yellow and blue.

References 

Football clubs in Molise
Association football clubs established in 1964
Association football clubs disestablished in 2012
Italian football clubs established in 1964
2012 disestablishments in Italy